Astrotactin (Astn1) is a glycoprotein expressed on migrating neurons that favors adhesion to glia and migration. It is involved in regulation of adhesion during the radial migration of neurons in the developing CNS. Its expression is limited to cells in the cortex and cerebellum. 
 Alberts, B.(1994) Molecular Biology of the Cell
 Price et al., (2011) Building Brains

Glycoproteins